"The Stumble" is a blues guitar instrumental composed  and recorded by American blues artist Freddie King, for his 1961 album Let's Hide Away and Dance Away with Freddy King.  It was released as the fourth single from this album in 1962.  It is considered a blues classic, and follows in a string of popular instrumentals recorded by King in the early 1960s, including "Hide Away", "San-Ho-Zay", and "Sen-Sa-Shun".

Other recordings

"The Stumble" has  been recorded by many artists, including:
 The Yardbirds Glimpses (1965)
 John Mayall's Bluesbreakers with Peter Green A Hard Road (1967)
 Love Sculpture Blues Helping (1968) 
 Luther Allison from his album Bad News Is Coming (1972)
 Henry Vestine I Used to Be Mad! (But Now I'm Half Crazy) (1981)
 Gary B.B. Coleman from his album Nothin' but the Blues (1987)
 Jeff Beck Twins soundtrack (1988) 
 Pappo (as "El Tropezón") Blues Local (1992)
 Steve Hackett Blues with a Feeling (1994)
 Jimmy Thackery Wild Night Out! (1995)
 Ronnie Earl Blues Guitar Virtuoso Live in Europe (1995)
 Gary Moore Gary Moore – The Definitive Montreux Collection (1995)
 Peter Green Splinter Group Peter Green Splinter Group (1997)
 Bugs Henderson Heartbroke Again (1998)
 Eric Bell Live Tonite...Plus! (2001)

References

1961 songs
Freddie King songs
Blues songs
1960s instrumentals
1962 singles
Federal Records singles
Songs written by Sonny Thompson